Pautujärvi is a medium-sized lake in the Paatsjoki main catchment area. It is located in Kaldoaivi Wilderness Area in the region Lapland in Finland. Quite near is a bit larger lake Iijärvi, although it belongs to a different main catchment area, catchment of Näätämö River.

See also
List of lakes in Finland

References

Lakes of Inari, Finland